Gustavo David Miguel Diaz-Infante (born March 31, 1964) is a former professional American football guard and center and current assistant offensive line coach for the Los Angeles Chargers of the NFL. In the National Football League, he played for the San Diego Chargers, Denver Broncos, and the Philadelphia Eagles.  Diaz-Infante also played in the World League of American Football for the Frankfurt Galaxy, in the Canadian Football League for the Sacramento Gold Miners and in the XFL with the Las Vegas Outlaws. Diaz-Infante played college football at San Jose State University. Conducted in SJSU Sports Hall of Fame, and Bellarmine College Prep Hall of Fame. Diaz-Infante was a Voice of Denver Broncos Color Analyst for the Denver Bronco's Radio Network.

Early life Historical Family
Diaz-Infante's father General Marco Ignacio Infante, was a Mexican immigrant to the U.S. who served in the US Army in WW2, he was a Zapatista, and a Politician who knew John F. Kennedy, and Fidel Castro, Infante died in 1988; Diaz-Infante's mother is Finnish American.  Diaz-Infante graduated from Bellarmine College Prep in 1982.

College
From 1982 to 1987, Diaz-Infante attended San Jose State University, and was inducted into the Hall of Fame.

Professional career
Undrafted in 1987, Diaz-Infante signed as a free agent with the San Diego Chargers during the NFL Players Association strike that year.

Diaz-Infante served as the long snapper for the 1997 and 1998 Bronco Super Bowl wins

Diaz-Infante was contacted by Todd Bowles, head coach for the New York Jets, in early January 2016 and offered the position of assistant offensive line coach, which he accepted.

Broadcasting career
Diaz-Infante served as a color analyst for ESPN, covering West Coast college football.  Prior to this, he was an analyst for the Big East Network and a co-host of Denver AM radio station 760 the Zone's afternoon sports talk-show, with fellow former Broncos lineman Mark Schlereth. Also a Voice of Denver Bronco's Color Analyst for the Denver Bronco's Radio Network.

References

1964 births
Living people
American football long snappers
American football offensive linemen
American people of Finnish descent
American sportspeople of Mexican descent
American players of Canadian football
Canadian football offensive linemen
College football announcers
Denver Broncos announcers
Denver Broncos players
Frankfurt Galaxy players
Las Vegas Outlaws (XFL) players
National Football League announcers
Philadelphia Eagles players
Players of American football from San Jose, California
Players of Canadian football from San Jose, California
Sacramento Gold Miners players
San Diego Chargers players
San Jose State Spartans football players